Dwitiyo Purush (দ্বিতীয় পুরুষ) is the second solo album by Indian singer-songwriter Anupam Roy.

Phanka Frame & Ami Ajkal Bhalo Achhi were later featured in Srijit Mukherji's film Jaatishwar & Zulfiqar respectively.

Track listing 
All songs sung, composed and written by Anupam Roy.

Personnel

 Anupam Roy - Singer-songwriter
 Sandipan Parial – Drums, Cajon, Shakers
 Nabarun Bose – Keyboards, Programming and Backing Vocals
 Roheet Mukherjee – Bass Guitar
 Subhodip Banerjee – Acoustic & Electric Guitars
 Shomi Chatterjee - Sound Engineer

Release history
It was released on 14 February 2013.

References

2013 albums